The 2005 Polynesian Championships in Athletics took place in October or November, 2005.  The event was held at the Stade Pater Te Hono Nui in Papeete, French Polynesia.

A total of 22 events were contested, 11 by men, 10 by women, and 1 mixed.

Medal summary
Complete results can be found on the Oceania Athletics Association webpage and on the webpage of the French Polynesia Athletics Federation (Fédération d'Athlétisme de Polynésie Française).

Men

Women

Mixed

Medal table (unofficial)

References

Polynesian Championships in Athletics
Athletics competitions in French Polynesia
International sports competitions hosted by French Polynesia
Polynesian Championships
2005 in French Polynesian sport
November 2005 sports events in Oceania